Depot Peak is a solitary nunatak, with a single needle-shaped peak, lying about 37 nautical miles (70 km) north of the Stinear Nunataks in Mac. Robertson Land. It was discovered by an Australian National Antarctic Research Expeditions party led by R.G. Dovers during a southern journey in December 1954, and so named because a depot was established in the vicinity.

References

Mountains of Mac. Robertson Land